Micrurus hippocrepis (Mayan coral snake) is a species of elapid snake, native to Guatemala and Belize. There are no recognized subspecies.

References 

hippocrepis
Reptiles described in 1861
Taxa named by Wilhelm Peters
Snakes of Central America
Reptiles of Guatemala
Reptiles of Belize